Stepanovo is a rural locality (a village) in Klyazminskoye Rural Settlement, Kovrovsky District, Vladimir Oblast, Russia. The population was 12 as of 2010.

Geography 
Stepanovo is located 44 km east of Kovrov (the district's administrative centre) by road. Kuvezino is the nearest rural locality.

References 

Rural localities in Kovrovsky District